Jomante Slezaite ( born 1989) is a Lithuanian operatic soprano singer.

Jomantė graduated from the Lithuanian Academy of Music and Theatre and Kaunas Vytautas Magnus University Music Academy (class of Prof. Vladimiras Prudnikovas). She has participated in master classes taught by Ingrid Kremling (Hamburg), Wojciech Starostecki (Prague) and Verena Rein (Berlin).

She won the Klaudia Taev Competition in 2013 and received prizes at the Tiit Kuusik International Lied Competition (2012), Kaunas International Solo Song Contest (2012), and the Lonigo International Song Contest (2010).

References 

1989 births
Living people
21st-century Lithuanian women singers
People from Tauragė